Dzembronia may refer to:

Dzembronia (mountain)
Dzembronia (village)